The jaya (Aspidoparia jaya) is a species of cyprinid fish native to India, Nepal and Bangladesh where it occurs in hill streams. This species can reach a length of  TL.

References 

Danios
Fish described in 1822
Taxobox binomials not recognized by IUCN